was a Japanese track and field athlete. He competed in the men's triple jump at the 1952 Summer Olympics.

References

1922 births
1999 deaths
Place of birth missing
Japanese male triple jumpers
Olympic male triple jumpers
Olympic athletes of Japan
Athletes (track and field) at the 1952 Summer Olympics
20th-century Japanese people